Dimorphocalyx glabellus var. lawianus (Hook.f.) Chakrab. & N.P.Balakr. is a tree endemic to South India in semi-evergreen forests.

Flowering is from February–October and fruiting is from November–January. As in all species of Dimorphocalyx, flowers are dieocious.

References

Codiaeae
Flora of India (region)